Bacton may refer to various places in the United Kingdom:

 Bacton, Herefordshire, England
 Bacton, Norfolk, England
 Bacton Gas Terminal
 Bacton, Suffolk, England